Wadjitefni (also read as Wadjet-tefni) was an ancient Egyptian high official and prince living during the early 2nd Dynasty. It is disputed as to who was the king (pharaoh) that reigned during Wadjitefni's time of officeship.

Identity 
Wadjitefni is attested by two stone bowl inscriptions only. These were found in the underground storages beneath the Southern Gallery within the Pyramid of Djoser at Saqqara. He bore the title Son of the king (Egyptian: Sa-nesw).

Career 
Next to nothing is known about Wadjitefni's career, except for his title as a prince. It is also unknown, whose son he was, since no royal name was found. Calligraphic design and diction of the inscriptions show great resemblance to other inscriptions dating back to the time of the kings Nynetjer and Weneg-Nebty. Thus, Wadjitefni may have lived and served under these two kings.

References 

People of the Second Dynasty of Egypt
27th-century BC people
Ancient Egyptian princes